Guatteria tonduzii is a species of plant in the Annonaceae family. It is found in Colombia, Costa Rica, and Panama. It is threatened by habitat loss.

References

 Mitré, M. 1998.  Guatteria tonduzii.   2006 IUCN Red List of Threatened Species.   Downloaded on 21 August 2007.

tonduzii
Flora of Colombia
Flora of Costa Rica
Flora of Panama
Endemic flora of Venezuela
Near threatened plants
Near threatened biota of South America
Taxonomy articles created by Polbot